Store Svartdalspiggen is a mountain on the border of Vågå Municipality and Lom Municipality in Innlandet county, Norway. The mountain is surrounded by several other notable mountains including Knutsholstinden and Leirungstinden to the east; Langedalstinden, Kvitskardtinden, and Torfinnstindene to the southeast; Slettmarkpiggen, Slettmarkhøe, and Slettmarkkampen to the southwest; Snøholstinden and Store Rauddalseggi to the northwest; and Storådalshøi and Høgtunga to the north.

See also
List of mountains of Norway by height

References

Jotunheimen
Vågå
Lom, Norway
Mountains of Innlandet